Marung is a community council located in the Mokhotlong District of Lesotho. Its population in 2006 was 5,458.

Villages
The community of Marung includes the villages of Bobatsi, Botha-Bothe, Ha Khorole, Ha Liete, Ha Makaka, Ha Mathibela, Ha Moeketsane, Ha Mohai, Ha Mokoena, Ha Mokotjo, Ha Moleko, Ha Ntsika, Ha Ralitlhare, Ha Roelane, Ha Setoko, Ha Sibi, Ha Taelo, Ha Tšoeu, Khoaba-lea-oela, Koma-Koma, Lifatjaneng, Lifofaneng, Lihareseng, Lilatoleng, Mafikeng, Mafisoaneng, Makorotong, Mamothapeng, Mapokising, Meeling, Moeaneng, Motse-mocha, Phahameng, Taung and Tsekong.

References

External links
 Google map of community villages

Populated places in Mokhotlong District